Chang Man-yong (January 25, 1914 – 1977) was a Korean poet and journalist associated with the modernist movement of the 1930s.  He was born in Yeonbaek in Hwanghae province, under Japanese rule; he attended Gyeongseong High School in Seoul and later the Mijakki English School in Tokyo.

Considered a major representative of 1930s Korean modernism, he is distinct from other poets in that tradition in his embrace of pastoral lyricism.  Nostalgic themes of rural life were used to reflect the difficulty and anguish of the times in which Chang lived; he continued to use these devices to reflect the hardship of life in early South Korea.

Chang served as editor of the Seoul Shinmun, and was also president of the Society of Korean Poets.

References

See also
Korean literature
Korean poetry
List of Korean-language poets

1914 births
1977 deaths
Korean male poets
Literature of Korea under Japanese rule
20th-century Korean poets
20th-century male writers